Maria Wittek (noms de guerre "Mira", "Pani Maria"; Trębki, near Gostynin, 16 August 1899 – 19 April 1997, Warsaw, Poland)  served in the Polish Army and associated organizations from age 18 and, following retirement, in 1991 became the first Polish woman to be promoted to brigadier-general.

Early service
Maria Wittek was born and grew up in the Russian partition of Poland. Her father, Stanisław Wittek, a carpenter, was a member of the Polish Socialist Party (PPS) and moved with his family to Ukraine in 1915 to avoid being arrested by the Russian authorities. Maria while in high school joined the Polish scout troop in Kiev. She then became the first female student in the mathematics department of Kiev University. At the same time she joined the clandestine Polska Organizacja Wojskowa (Polish Military Organization) - and completed the NCO training course. In 1919 she joined the Polish army group that was fighting the Bolsheviks in Ukraine. Then in 1920 as a member of the Women's Volunteers she fought in the battle for Lwów (now Lviv) and was awarded the highest Polish medal Virtuti Militari for the first time.

Between the wars
From 1928 to 1934 she was the commander of the Przysposobienie Wojskowe Kobiet - an organization training women for military service. In 1935 she was appointed the head of the women's division at the Institute of Physical Education and Military Training in Bielany, near Warsaw.

In World War II
During the Invasion of Poland (1939) she was the commanding officer of the Women's Military Assistance Battalions. In October 1939 she joined the underground ZWZ which later became the Home Army. She was head of Women's Army Services on the staff of gen. Grot-Rowecki and later gen. Bor-Komorowski. She fought in the Warsaw Uprising and was promoted lieutenant colonel. After the capitulation she avoided being taken prisoner by the Germans and left the ruins of Warsaw among the civilians. She continued in her staff position of the Home Army until its dissolution in January 1945.

After the war

When the communist government of Poland reopened the Institute of Physical Education and Military Training, she initially returned to her previous position as head of the women's division. However, in 1949 she was arrested by the communist authorities and spent several months in prison. After her release she worked in a newspaper kiosk. She initiated the establishment of the "Commission for the History of Women". After the collapse of communist rule in Poland, President Lech Wałęsa appointed her brigadier general on May 2, 1991. Thus she became the first Polish woman to attain the rank of general. She never married.

On 19 April 2007, the 10th anniversary of her death, a life-size bronze monument of her was unveiled at the Polish Army Museum in Warsaw.

Awards
 Silver Cross of the Virtuti Militari, - twice
 Cross of Independence with Swords, (Krzyż Niepodległości)
 Cross of Valour (Krzyż Walecznych)
 Warsaw Cross of the Uprising

See also
 Wanda Gertz
 List of Poles
 Halszka Wasilewska (soldier)
 Elżbieta Zawacka

Sources

External links
  Article in Polish newspaper "Rzeczpospolita, May 2, 1997
  Ministry of Defence newsletter April 19 2007 - in Polish
 M. Ney Krwawicz, Women Soldiers of the Polish Home Army
  Monument to General Wittek at Military Museum, Warsaw

1899 births
1997 deaths
Polish women in World War I
Polish Army officers
Polish female soldiers
Polish Military Organisation members
Polish legionnaires (World War I)
Polish people of the Polish–Ukrainian War
Polish people of the Polish–Soviet War
Female resistance members of World War II
Polish generals
Polish resistance members of World War II
Recipients of the Virtuti Militari
Recipients of the Silver Cross of the Virtuti Militari
Recipients of the Cross of Independence with Swords
Recipients of the Cross of Valour (Poland)
Warsaw Uprising insurgents
Women in World War II
Women in European warfare
Polish women in war
Polish women in World War II resistance